Cortland is an unincorporated community in eastern Hamilton Township, Jackson County, Indiana, United States. It lies along State Road 258, northwest of the city of Seymour. Cortland's elevation is 561 feet (171 m), and it is located at  (38.9731084, -85.9641467). Although Cortland is unincorporated, it has a post office, with the ZIP code of 47228.

History
The Cortland post office was established in 1850. Cortland was named after Cortland, New York.

Notable events

Cortland is the home of the Jackson County Rodeo.

References

Unincorporated communities in Jackson County, Indiana
Unincorporated communities in Indiana